The purple-breasted sunbird (Nectarinia purpureiventris) is a species of bird in the family Nectariniidae.
It is found in Burundi, Democratic Republic of the Congo, Rwanda, and Uganda.

References

purple-breasted sunbird
Birds of Sub-Saharan Africa
purple-breasted sunbird
Taxonomy articles created by Polbot